The Perth Regiment was an infantry regiment of the Canadian Army. It is currently on the Supplementary Order of Battle.

Lineage
Lineage of The Perth Regiment:

The Perth Regiment (Overseas Battalion)

Originated 22 Dec as 110th (Overseas) Battalion, CEF
Disbanded 17 Jul 1917
Originated 1 Sep 1939 as The Perth Regiment (Machine Gun), CASF
Redesignated 2 Nov 1940 as 1st Battalion, The Perth Regiment (Machine Gun), CASF
Redesignated 11 Feb 1941 as 1st Battalion, The Perth Regiment (Motor), CASF
Redesignated 31 Jan 1943 as 1st Battalion, The Perth Regiment, CIC, CASF
Disbanded 31 Jan 1946

The Perth Regiment (Reserve Battalion)

Originated 14 Sep 1866 as 28th (Perth) Battalion of Infantry
Redesignated 8 May 1900 as 28th Perth Regiment
Redesignated 29 Mar 1920 as The Perth Regiment
Amalgamated 15 Dec 1936 with C Company of the 2nd Machine Gun Battalion, CMGC and redesignated as The Perth Regiment (Machine Gun)
Redesignated 7 Nov 1940 as 2nd (Reserve) Battalion, The Perth Regiment (Machine Gun)
Redesignated 1 Apr 1941 as 2nd (Reserve) Battalion, The Perth Regiment (Motor)
Redesignated 1 Apr 1946 as The Perth Regiment
Amalgamated 1 October 1954 with The Highland Light Infantry of Canada and renamed The Perth and Waterloo Regiment (Highland Light Infantry of Canada)
Amalgamation ceased 1 April 1957 and resumed as The Perth Regiment
Assigned to the Supplementary Order of Battle 28 Feb 1965, and reduced to nil strength

Lineage Chart 

|- 
|style="text-align: left;"|
 class="wikitable"
+ Abbreviations used in the chart
-
! Abbreviation !! Phrase
-
 Bn  Battalion
-
 CASF  Canadian Active Service Force
-
 CEF  Canadian Expeditionary Force
-
 CIC  Canadian Infantry Corps
-
 CMGC  Canadian Machine Gun Corps
-
 Coy  Company
-
 Infy  Infantry
-
 MG  Machine gun
-
 Regt  Regiment

Perpetuations 
 110th Battalion (Perth), CEF

History

Early History 
In 1838, the Third Regiment of Huron was organized in the territory which is now the south part of Perth County, Ontario.  This was a paper organization of the compulsory militia, to which every able-bodied male citizen in theory belonged. It did not have equipment, did not train, and while it continued to exist after the voluntary militia was formed, it was distinct from the volunteers.

The Stratford Volunteer Rifle Company was formed in 1856, elected its own officers, and carried on entirely at the expense of its members for two years, before it was officially recognized in 1858.

In response to the Fenian Raids, a temporary battalion-sized composite unit was formed in 1866 at Thorold, Ontario. It consisted of companies from Stratford, Chatham, Ingersoll, St. Thomas and Guelph.

A general order of the Militia Department of the Province of Canada, dated 14 September 1866 authorized a regimental headquarters. Robert Service of Stratford was promoted to Lt Col and appointed to command. The Stratford Volunteer Rifle Company became No. 1 Company of the regiment. Other companies were in Listowel and St. Marys

The principle of Militia units was voluntary service and year-round training while carrying on with civilian life. The Perth Regiment maintained this principle throughout its peacetime service.

First World War 
On 6 August 1914, during events which led to the First World War, details of the regiment were placed on active service for local protection duties.

The Canadian Expeditionary Force (CEF) was organized in 1914 and 1915 using numbered battalions, which had little connection with the existing militia regiments.  The 110th Battalion (Perth), CEF was authorized on 22 December 1915. The Perth Regiment recruited the 110th Battalion from Perth county.

The 110th Battalion embarked for Great Britain on 31 October 1916 with a strength of 679 all ranks. On 2 January 1917, personnel of the 110th Battalion were absorbed by the 8th Battalion, CEF to provide reinforcements for the Canadian Corps in the field. The 110th Battalion was disbanded on 17 July 1917.

Second World War 
The 1st Battalion, The Perth Regiment, was mobilized 1 September 1939 for service in World War II. The 1st Battalion embarked for Great Britain on 9 October 1941. It landed in Italy on 8 November 1943, as part of the 11th Infantry Brigade, 5th Canadian Division. The 1st Battalion transferred with the I Canadian Corps to North-West Europe in March 1945, where it fought until the end of the war. It returned home under command of a Perth militia officer, Lt Col MW Andrew and was disbanded on January 31, 1946.

The 2nd (Reserve) Battalion, headquartered in Stratford, was authorized in 1940 and trained recruits for the 1st Battalion.

Post War 
In 1954, as a result of the Kennedy Report on the Reserve Army, this regiment was amalgamated with The Highland Light Infantry of Canada to form The Perth and Waterloo Regiment (Highland Light Infantry of Canada). This was not a successful amalgamation, and in 1957 the two units reverted to their former designations.

In June 1964, The Commission on the Reorganization of the Canadian Army (Militia), commonly called the Suttie Commission, issued its report. The Commission proposed the Supplementary Order of Battle to maintain the name of deactivated units and to facilitate reactivation. The commission further recommended that the Perth Regiment be transferred to the Supplementary Order of Battle and that the regiment's personnel be absorbed by 3 RCR (now 4 RCR).

On 28 February 1965, The Perth Regiment was reduced to nil strength and placed on the Supplementary Order of Battle. At the time it was inactivated, The Perth Regiment consisted of a company in Stratford and a support platoon in St Marys.

Before being moved to the Supplementary Order of Battle, The Perth Regiment its final Order of Precedence as 16.

Alliances 
The Perth Regiment was allied to the Cameronians, the Otago Regiment of New Zealand, 26th Battalion of Australia, and the Witwatersrand Rifles of South Africa.

Uniform 
They wore Douglas kilt, green glengarry with green & white diced border, grey sporran with three black points, Douglas hose, and green garter flashes.

Battle Honours
In the list below, battle honours in small capitals were awarded for participation in large operations and campaigns, while those in lowercase indicate honours granted for more specific battles. The battle honours written in bold are emblazoned on the regimental colour.

Colours

The first set of colours was presented by the 28th Regiment Chapter IODE, on 15 June 1927 at Queen's Park Stratford, Ontario.

The second set of colours was presented by the Honourable John Keiller MacKay, Lieutenant Governor of Ontario on 30 June 1962 at Queen's Park Stratford, Ontario.

Both sets of colours are laid up at St. James' Anglican Church, Stratford, Ontario.

Commanding Officers

Overseas Battalion: 
1915 - LCol JL Youngs
1917 - Disbanded
1939 - LCol SH McComb, ED
1940 - LCol (later Col) GW Little, MVO, OBE, MC, ED
1942 - LCol (later BGen) ISH Lind, DSO, ED
1943 - LCol (later Col) HET Doucet, OBE, ED (May - Sep)
1943 - LCol (later BGen) WS Rutherford, ED
1944 - LCol (later BGen) ISH Lind, DSO, ED (Mar - May)
1944 - LCol (later BGen) WW Reid, DSO
1944 - LCol MW Andrew, DSO, ED, QC
1946 - Disbanded

Reserve Battalion 
1866 - LCol Robert S Service
1872 - LCol WM Smith, VD
1881 - LCol D Scot
1885 - LColl RS McKnight
1898 - LCol AAW Whight
1903 - LCol WG Moscrip, VD
1908 - LCol GT Cooke
1912 - LCol WM Lawrence, VD
1920 - LCol JL Youngs, MC
1923 - LCol AW Deacon, MC
1928 - LCol RM Trow
1933 - LCol H Denroche
1933 - LCol A Garrod, MC, ED
1939 - LCol SH McComb, ED
1940 - LCol GDL Rice, ED
1944 - Maj TW Orr
1946 - LCol John S Whyte, ED
1950 - LCol (later B Gen) WH Hempell, CD
1954 - LCol EM Hutchinson, CD
1959 - LCol FW Savage, CD
1962 - LCol EB Burnett, ED
1964 - LCol EC Skowby, CD
1965 - Assigned to Supplementary Order of battle and reduced to nil strength

Photo Gallery

See Also 

 Canadian-Scottish regiment

References

Bibliography
 
 

Infantry regiments of Canada
Highland & Scottish regiments of Canada
Military units and formations of Ontario
Military units and formations established in 1866
Military units and formations disestablished in 1965
1866 establishments in Canada
Infantry regiments of Canada in World War II
Supplementary Order of Battle